The 10th Infantry Division (10-ya Pekhotnaya Diviziya) was an infantry formation of the Russian Imperial Army that existed in various formations from the early 19th century until the end of World War I and the Russian Revolution. The division was based in Warsaw and later Nizhny Novgorod in the years leading up to 1914. It fought in World War I and was demobilized in 1918.

Organization 
The 10th Infantry Division was part of the 5th Army Corps.
1st Brigade (HQ Nizhny Novgorod)
37th Yekaterinburg Infantry Regiment
38th Tobolsk Infantry Regiment
2nd Brigade (HQ Kozlov): 
39th Tomsk Infantry Regiment 
40th Kolyvan Infantry Regiment
10th Artillery Brigade

Commanders
1915–1916: Vasily Timofeyvich Gavrilov

References 

Infantry divisions of the Russian Empire
Military units and formations disestablished in 1918
Nizhny Novgorod Governorate